The Battle of Hong Kong (8–25 December 1941) was one of the first battles of the Pacific War in World War II.

Allied

Garrison Commander & Fortress Command
General Officer Commanding, Hong Kong: Major General Christopher Maltby
Assistant Adjutant and Quartermaster General: Brig. Andrew Peffers
General Staff Officer, I: Col. Lancey Newnham

Ground forces
The British ground forces consisted of the following units:
 2nd Battalion, the Royal Scots Regiment (Lt. Col. Simon E. H. E. White)
 1st Battalion, the Middlesex Regiment (Lt. Col. Henry W. M. Stewart)
 Royal Rifles of Canada (Lt. Col. William J. Home)
 Winnipeg Grenadiers (Lt. Col. John L. R. Sutcliffe)
 5th Battalion, 7th Rajput Regiment (Lt. Col. John. Cadogan-Rawlinson)
 2nd Battalion, 14th Punjab Regiment (Lt. Col. Gerald R. Kidd)
 Hong Kong Chinese Regiment (Maj. H. W. A. Mayer)
 Hong Kong Volunteer Defence Corps (Col. Henry B. Rose)
 Infantry companies No. 1–7
 Artillery batteries 1st–5th
 Field Company Engineers
 Signals
 Armoured Car Platoon
 Army Service Corps Company
 Dispatch Sections
 Hughes Group
 Field Ambulance unit (Lt. Col. Lindsay Ride)
 St. John's Ambulance
 Royal Artillery (Brigadier Tom McCleod)
 8th Coast Regiment, Royal Artillery (Lt. Col. Shelby Shaw)
 12th Coast Battery (Maj. W. M. Stevenson)
 30th Coast Battery (Maj. C. R. Templer)
 36th Coast Battery (Capt. W. N. J. Pitt)
 12th Coast Regiment, Royal Artillery (Maj. Richard L. J. Penfold)
 24th Coast Battery (Capt. E. W. S. Anderson)
 26th Coast Battery (Lt. A. O. G. Mills)
 5th Anti-Aircraft Regiment, Royal Artillery (Lt. Col. Fred D. Field)
7th Battery
17th Light Anti-Aircraft Battery
18th Light Anti-Aircraft Battery
5th HKVDC Battery
 965 Defence Battery, Hong Kong–Singapore Royal Artillery (Maj. Basil T. C. Forrester)
 1st Regiment, Hong Kong–Singapore Royal Artillery (Maj. John C. Yale)
 1st Mountain Battery
 2nd Mountain Battery
 3rd Medium Battery
 4th Medium Battery
 25th Medium Battery
 26th Coast Battery
 17th Anti-Aircraft Gun Battery
 Royal Engineers China Command (Col. Esmond H. M. Clifford)
 HQ Fortress Engineers
 22nd Fortress Company, Royal Engineers (Maj. D. C. E. Grose)
 40th Fortress Company, Royal Engineers (Maj. D. I. M. Murray)
 Royal Engineers Services

Brigades
Infantry may be assigned to one of the two defensive brigades:
Kowloon Infantry Brigade
Brigadier Cedric Wallis
Hong Kong Infantry Brigade
Brigadier J. K. Lawson

Headquarters and support corps
British and local forces

Canadian

Indian

Civilian
Civilian forces were as follows:
 MI6
 Hong Kong Police Force (Commissioner of Police John Pennefather-Evans)
 Indian Company, Police Reserve
 Chinese Company, Police Reserve
 Fire Brigade (Jack Fitz-Henry)
 Air Raid Precautions
 St. John's Ambulance
 Navy, Army and Air Force Institutes
Auxiliary Services

Naval forces

Royal Navy

Commander: Captain Alfred C. Collinson

The Royal Navy presence were as follows:
 Royal Marine detachment (Maj. Farrington)
 
  (Lt. Cdr. Arthur Luard Pears)
  (Lt. Cdr. Hedworth Lambton)
  (Lt. Cdr. Bernard Davies)
  (Lt. John Douglas)
  (Cdr. Hugh M. Montague)
  (Lt. Cdr. Henry C. S. Collingwood-Selby)
  (Lt. Cdr. John C. Boldero)
  (Lt. Cdr. R. C. Creer)
 Hong Kong Royal Naval Volunteer Reserve (Lt. Cdr. R. J. D. Vernall)
 Queen Alexandra's Royal Naval Nursing Service
 Royal Naval Dockyard Police
 Hong Kong Dockyard Defence Corps (Maj. D. Campbell)
Auxiliary patrol vessels

Minor vessels

2nd MTB Flotilla (Lt. Cdr. Gerrard H. Gandy)
 MTB 07 (Lt. R. R. W. Ashby)
 MTB 08 (Lt. L. D. Kilbee)
 MTB 09 (Lt. A. Kennedy)
 MTB 10 (Lt. Cdr. G. H. Gandy)
 MTB 11 (Lt. C. J. Collingwood)
 MTB 12 (Sub-Lt. J. B. Colls)
 MTB 26 (Lt. D. W. Wagstaff)
 MTB 27 (Lt. T. M. Parsons)

Merchant Navy
Ships of the Merchant Navy:

Air forces
 Fleet Air Arm, Royal Navy (Lt. P. J. Milner-Barry)
 Supermarine Walrus L2259
 Supermarine Walrus L2819
 Hong Kong Station, Royal Air Force (Wng. Cdr. Humphrey G. Sullivan)
 Vickers Vildebeest K2924
 Vickers Vildebeest K2818
 Vickers Vildebeest K6370
 HKVDC Flight (Sq. Ldr. Donald "Sammy" Hill)
 1 x Avro 621 Tutor
 2 x Hornet Moth
 2 x Cadet biplanes

Japanese

Ground forces
The Japanese ground forces consisted of the following units:

23rd Army
Commander: Lieutenant General Takashi Sakai
Chief of Staff: Major General Tadamichi Kuribayashi
Deputy Chief of Staff: Major General Keishichiro Higuchi 

38th Division
Commander: Lieutenant General Tadayoshi Sano

 Infantry HQ, 38th Division (Maj. Gen. Takeo Itō)
 228th Infantry Regiment (Col. Sadashichi Doi)
 229th Infantry Regiment (Col. Ryosaburo Tanaka)
 230th Infantry Regiment (Col. Toshinari Shōji)
 38th Mountain Gun Regiment (Col. Takekichi Kamiyoshi)
 38th Engineers Regiment (Lt. Col. Tsuneō Iwabuchi)
 38th Logistic Regiment (Lt. Col. Shūichi Yabuta)
 19th Independent Engineer Regiment (Lt. Col. Shoshirō Inukai)
 20th Independent Engineer Regiment (Col. Kiyoshi Suzukawa)
 2nd Company, 14th Independent Engineering Regiment (Maj. Eiichi Kusagi)
 21st Independent Mortar Battalion (Maj. Shigeo Okamoto)
 Signal Corps (Maj. Ryōichi Itō)
 Araki Detachment (Col. Masatoshi Araki)
 66th Infantry Regiment  – Less 1 Company
 Attached Force
 10th Independent Mountain Gun Regiment (Col. Rikichirō Sawamoto)
 20th Independent Mountain Gun Battalion (Lt. Col. Jirō Kajimatsu)
 2nd Quick-Firing Gun Battalion (Lt. Col. Takeo Ōno)
 5th Quick-Firing Gun Battalion (Maj. Jirō Aoki)
 1st Artillery Group (Lt. Gen. Kaneo Kitajima)
 1st Heavy Artillery Regiment (Col. Masayoshi Hayakawa)
 14th Heavy Field Gun Regiment (Col. Takeaki Satō)
 2nd Independent Heavy Artillery Battalion (Maj. Kiyotoshi Kanamaru)
 3rd Independent Heavy Artillery Battalion (Lt. Col. Hitomi Kanmei)
 2nd Heavy Mortar Battalion (Maj. Deiichi Namimatsu)

Other divisional support
 Armour Squadron (Capt. Jūrō Atami)
 3rd Transport Regiment (Lt. Col. Otokazu Kobayashi)  – Only 3 companies
 19th Independent Transport Company
 20th Independent Transport Company
 21st Independent Transport Company
 1st River Crossing Material Company, 9th Division (Lt. Hiroshi Furumori)
 2nd River Crossing Material Company, 9th Division (Lt. Eda Asao)
 Ordnance team (Capt. Sadaharu Koide)
 5th Field Gas Company (Capt. Magosaburō Suzuki)
 18th Field Gas Company (Lt. Isamu Morimoto
 Veterinary (Vet. Maj. Jiro Hayashi)
 1st Field Hospital (Dr. Maj. Toshimi Suzuki)
 2nd Field Hospital (Dr. Maj. Takuzō Itō)
 Field Pigeon Carrier Company
 South China MP Platoon (Maj. Kennosuke Noma)
 Medical unit
 Medical unit, 51st Division (Col. Otokazu Hattori) – Only 1/3 of the unit 
 17th Field Water Purification and Supply Unit
 Army signal corps
 Two radio signal platoons
 One wire signal platoon

Naval forces

 2nd China Fleet
 Commander: Vice Admiral Masaichi Niimi
 Chief of Staff: Brigadier Yasuo Yasuba 

 
 2 x Kawanishi E7K
 3 x Kugisho B3Y

Bombardment Group:

Attack Group:

Air forces
 23rd Army Air Unit, 1st Air Group
 45th Flying Sentai (Col. Shuji Habu) – 29 x Kawasaki Ki-32
 10th Independent Chutai (Maj. Akira Takatsuki) – 13 x Nakajima Ki-27
 18th Independent Chutai (Capt. Minoru Kobayashi) – 3 x Mitsubishi Ki-15
 44th Independent Squadron (Capt. Yoshio Naito) – 6 x Tachikawa Ki-36
 47th Air-Field Battalion (Maj. Sadayu Uemura)
 67th Air-Field Company, 67th Air Field Battalion (Capt. Nobunaga Kodama)
 57th Air-Field Company (2nd Lt. Mitsuhiro Makita) – Elements
 14th Flying Sentai
 Kanoya Air Group

See also
List of orders of battle
British Forces Overseas Hong Kong
C Force

Notes

References

Bibliography

World War II orders of battle
Battle of Hong Kong